Rupal is a village in the Rupal Valley of the Astore District in Gilgit–Baltistan, Pakistan. It lies to the south of Tarashing village on the west end of Tarashing Glacier. Nanga Parbat and Rakhiot Peak lie northwest of the village and Chongra Peak (another peak of the Nanga Parbat massif) lies to the north.

See also
 Rupal Valley
 Rupal Peak
 Astore Valley

Populated places in Astore District